Sylvester's theorem or Sylvester's formula describes a particular interpretation of the sum of three pairwise distinct vectors of equal length in the context of triangle geometry. It is also referred to as Sylvester's (triangle) problem in literature, when it is given as a problem rather than a theorem. The theorem is named after the British mathematician James Joseph Sylvester.

Theorem 
Now let  denote the orthocenter of the triangle, then connection vector   is equal to the sum of the three vectors:

Generalisation 

If the condition of equal length in Sylvester's theorem is dropped and one considers merely three arbitrary pairwise distinct vectors, then the equation above does not hold anymore. However the relation with the centroid remains true, that is:

 

References

External links 
 
Darij Grinberg: Solution to American Mathematical Monthly Problem 11398 by Stanley Huang – contains Sylvester's theorem including its proof as a lemma

Theorems about triangles
Triangle problems